The Merrion Centre in Dublin, Ireland is a shopping centre situated at the junction of Nutley Lane with Merrion Road. It serves the community of Dublin 4. It is anchored by the Tesco supermarket and the Japanese embassy is located in the centre.

The centre was once home to one of the last remaining Quinnsworth stores owned by Peter Quinn of Nutley Lane. In the late 1990s, the centre underwent a renovation and a Tesco Ireland store was opened.

A free underground car park is provided, with about a quarter of the spaces reserved for the office workers.

The Tony Walsh pharmacy was used in the 2003 movie Intermission, but filmed to look as if it were outdoors.

External links
 The Merrion Centre

Shopping centres in County Dublin
Merrion, Dublin
Buildings and structures in Dublin (city)